Adana Science High School; is a public boarding high school in Adana, Turkey with a curriculum concentrated on natural sciences and mathematics. It was established in 1987. Due to the considerable success of its alumni in all aspects of professional life and academia, science high school concept is spread around the country and now there are public and private science high schools in all major cities. Its alumni includes many scientists, engineers and doctors as well as famed musicians .

The historical building of the school (Taş Bina) was built as an orphanage for Adana massacre’s survivors (Darüleytam) in 1909.

See also
 Science High School (disambiguation)

References

External links
  Official website

High schools in Adana
Educational institutions established in 1987
1987 establishments in Turkey
Science High Schools in Turkey